Dronfield railway station serves the town of Dronfield in Derbyshire, England, south of Sheffield, on the Midland Main Line between Chesterfield and Sheffield.

History
Construction of the Sheffield & Chesterfield line was authorised by the Midland Railway Act of 1864 but it was not until Monday 2 February 1870 that the line and Dronfield station were opened to traffic. It was designed by the Midland Railway company architect John Holloway Sanders.

The line was known as the "New Road" to differentiate from the "Old Road" built by the North Midland Railway, which took an easier route along the Rother Valley and bypassed Sheffield. The station is on the long climb up the Drone valley to Bradway Tunnel at the point where the gradient steepens from 1 in 201 to 1 in 102.

The station had single storey wooden buildings on both platforms. The main buildings, including booking office and staff offices, were on the "up" platform. The smaller building on the other platform contained a waiting room and a ladies' waiting room.

To the south of the passenger station, on the land now used as a car park, was the goods station with a brick-built warehouse and several sidings.

The station was closed to passengers with effect from Monday 2 January 1967, the last passenger train to call being the 21:41 Sheffield - Derby service on Saturday 31 December 1966. The station remained staffed for two years after closure until the goods station closed. The buildings were demolished in June 1973 but the platforms remained.

Between 15 and 19 February 1979, British Rail temporarily reopened the station (along with Wadsley Bridge and the Midland Main Line platforms at Dore) because road transport throughout Sheffield had been brought to a standstill by heavy snowfall. Many trains on the Midland Main Line served the station during that period, and special single fares of 20p were charged to both Chesterfield and Sheffield.  Demand for the special services was so high on Friday 16 February that "passengers [travelling to] Sheffield were queueing on the station approach — the platforms being completely full".  The station then reopened permanently to passengers on 5 January 1981 with a limited service at peak periods only.

The station is managed by Northern. However, until 14 December 2008 no Northern services stopped there. A residents' pressure group, Friends of Dronfield Station, successfully campaigned for rail services to the town to be improved and continue to beautify the station and press for better facilities.

Stationmasters
In 1872 the station master George Poplar faced a case at Derby Sheriff’s Court for a breach of promise in relation to an engagement he had entered into with Miss Matilda Hunt. Although the plaintiff asked for damages of £500, the station master was on a weekly wage of 26s, so the court awarded only £30.

George Poplar 1870 - 1896 
George Wheelock 1896 - 1908
George A. Yates 1908 - 1916 (afterwards station master at St Albans)
R.E. Dilworth 1916 -1926
E.J. Clulow 1926 - 1932 (formerly station master at Charfield, afterwards station master at Long Eaton)
Edmund T. Jackson 1932 - 1940 (afterwards station master at Spondon)
E.J. Straight from 1940 
C. James ca. 1946 - 1950 (afterwards station master at Hindley, Lancashire)
R.S. Lamb from 1950 (formerly station master at Haborough)

Service

From 14 December 2008 Northern started running a new hourly Express Service from Leeds to Nottingham calling at Wakefield Kirkgate, Barnsley, Meadowhall Interchange, Sheffield, Dronfield, Chesterfield, Alfreton and Langley Mill. Most of these services call at Dronfield.

A small number of peak time East Midlands Railway Liverpool - Norwich services stop, including one Derby - Sheffield train in the morning operated by a mainline Class 222 unit.  However mainline services from Leeds, Sheffield and London run through at high speed, and do not stop. Interchange with mainline services can be made at Sheffield and Chesterfield.

References

External links

Friends of Dronfield Station

Railway stations in Derbyshire
DfT Category F2 stations
Former Midland Railway stations
Railway stations in Great Britain opened in 1870
Railway stations in Great Britain closed in 1967
Railway stations in Great Britain opened in 1981
Reopened railway stations in Great Britain
Railway stations served by East Midlands Railway
Northern franchise railway stations
Beeching closures in England
Dronfield
John Holloway Sanders railway stations